Her (Original Score) is the film score composed by Arcade Fire and Owen Pallett for the 2013 film Her, directed by Spike Jonze and starring Joaquin Phoenix and Scarlett Johansson. The score was not officially released to the public until March 2021.

It was nominated for Best Original Score at the 86th Academy Awards.

Background 
The score for the film was credited to Arcade Fire, with additional music by Owen Pallett. Arcade Fire's Will Butler and Pallett were the major contributors. At the 86th Academy Awards, the score was nominated for Best Original Score. In addition to the score, Arcade Fire also wrote the song "Supersymmetry" for the film, which also appears on their album Reflektor. The melody for the song from the same album, called "Porno", can also be heard during the soundtrack. Yeah Yeah Yeahs frontwoman Karen O recorded the song "The Moon Song", a duet with Vampire Weekend frontman Ezra Koenig, which was nominated for an Academy Award for Best Original Song.

Release 
Initially, the soundtrack had not been released to the general public in either digital or physical form. A 13-track score appeared for streaming on the website 8tracks.com in January 2014, before being taken down. Warner Bros. Pictures, the film's distributor, provided no official statement on the absence of an official release of the score. Earlier in 2013, Warner Bros. sent promotional CDs of the score and "The Moon Song" to critics for review. Copies of the promotional CDs later ended up on online auction websites. The score was ultimately made available through unofficial YouTube streams and illegal downloads.

During an "Ask Me Anything" (AMA) on Reddit on June 17, 2016, Will Butler mentioned the possibility of a future vinyl release. Finally, on February 10, 2021, Arcade Fire announced that the score would be available for the first time digitally, on white-colored vinyl, and on cassette on March 19, 2021, by Milan Records.

Critical reception 

Michael Roffman of Consequence of Sound gave the score an "A" rating, calling it "a strikingly human and organic collection of music that keeps the film grounded in reality."

Accolades

Track listing 

Notes
 "Milk & Honey #1" was titled "Milk & Honey" on the promotional release.
 "Milk & Honey #2" was titled "Milk & Honey (Alan Watts & 641)" on the promotional release.

Charts

References 

Arcade Fire albums
Owen Pallett albums
Film scores
2021 soundtrack albums
Milan Records soundtracks
Instrumental soundtracks
Drama film soundtracks
Science fiction film soundtracks
Romance film soundtracks
Classical music soundtracks
Collaborative albums